Edward Aspinwall, D.D. (died 1732), was an English polemical divine.

Life

Aspinwall received his education at Cambridge University, and was appointed chaplain to the Earl of Radnor. Afterwards he became sub-dean of the Chapel Royal, and in 1729 was instituted prebendary of Westminster.

Aspinwall died on 3 August 1732.

Works

Aspinwall was the author of a Preservative against Popery, 1715, and an Apology, being a series of Arguments in Proof of the Christian Religion, 1731. The Apology, mainly directed against the deist Anthony Collins, was prefaced by an address 'To all Impartial Freethinkers,' in which Aspinwall articulated his ideal of impartiality:

References

17th-century births
1732 deaths
Alumni of Clare College, Cambridge
18th-century English Anglican priests
English chaplains
18th-century English non-fiction writers
18th-century English male writers
18th-century English writers
English religious writers
Canons of Westminster